Kebba Badjie (born 22 August 1999) is a Gambian professional footballer who plays as a left winger for  club VfB Oldenburg.

Career
Born in Serekunda, The Gambia, Badjie grew up in the country before fleeing to Germany aged 14. After nine goals in 21 games for VfL Oldenburg, he joined Werder Bremen II in summer 2019. He signed a professional contract with Werder Bremen in January 2021, and joined Hallescher FC in the 3. Liga on a year-long loan in summer 2021.

In June 2022 Badjie moved to VfB Oldenburg, newly promoted to the 3. Liga.

References

External links

1999 births
Living people
Gambian footballers
People from Serekunda
Association football wingers
VfL Oldenburg players
SV Werder Bremen II players
SV Werder Bremen players
Hallescher FC players
VfB Oldenburg players
3. Liga players
Regionalliga players
Gambian expatriate footballers
Gambian expatriate sportspeople in Germany
Expatriate footballers in Germany